Juan Bautista Rael (August 14, 1900 – November 8, 1993) was an American ethnographer, linguist, and folklorist who was a pioneer in the study of the people, stories, and language of Northern New Mexico and southern Colorado in the Southwestern United States. Rael was a professor at Stanford University. He donated his considerable collection of ethnographic materials to the Library of Congress.

Childhood and education 
Rael was born in the northern New Mexico village of Arroyo Hondo, near Taos, to an ethnic Spanish family whose ancestors dated to colonial times.  Rael was one of five children (four sons and one daughter) of José Ignacio Rael and Soledad Santistevan. His father was a merchant and sheep rancher.

Rael's parents sent him away to school because of limited educational options in their town. He attended elementary school at Saint Michael's College in Santa Fe, New Mexico. He next attended Christian Brothers' College in St. Louis, Missouri, where he earned a high school diploma.

In 1923, Rael completed his B.A. in linguistics and folklore from St. Mary's College in Oakland, California. In 1927, Rael received his M.A. from the University of California, Berkeley.

Career
Rael taught for several years as an associate professor at the University of Oregon before beginning his doctoral studies. He began to focus his research on the Alabados, or religious songs, of the Hispano region of Northern New Mexico and southern Colorado. He was familiar with these from childhood. He also began to study the folk and nativity plays of Mexico and New Mexico.

In 1933, Rael began his doctoral studies at Stanford University, invited by and under the supervision of folklorist Aurelio Espinosa. Rael was awarded his Ph.D. in linguistics in 1937. His dissertation was on the phonology and morphology of New Mexican Spanish. He did pioneering work in the collection of folktales in many forms, as well as the Nativity plays typical of Christmas celebrations.  Rael collected more than 410 folktales, tracing some to European origins. It was published in 1977 under the title Cuentos Españoles de Colorado y Nuevo Mexico (Spanish Folk Tales of Colorado and New Mexico). It is the most extensive collection of folk tales from the oral tradition in Spanish America.

In 1946, Rael began creating opportunities for students to study in Mexico.  In 1953 he formalized the program by founding the University of Guadalajara Summer School, which he directed for 18 years. "Courses offered ranged from language classes at several levels to courses in
Mexican art, geography, history, literature and Spanish literature." The summer school was sponsored jointly by the Universidad Autónoma de Guadalajara and the University of Arizona. The Summer School continues as part of the Foreign Studies Program of the University of Arizona.

Marriage and family
In 1923, the year Rael graduated from college, he married Quirina de la Luz Espinosa, daughter of Francisco Antonio Espinosa and Maria Rosabel Lobato of Antonito, Conejos County, Colorado. They had four children together, each of whom also went on to graduate from Stanford University, as did some of the Raels' grandchildren. From 1933 on, they lived near Stanford University, where his academic career was based.

Legacy and honors
 1974, elected to membership in the Academia Norteamericana de la Lengua Española
 1983, named a Corresponding Member of the Royal Spanish Academy.
He also received honors from several Mexican institutions and from the city of Guadalajara.

Works 
 "New Mexican Wedding Songs", published in Southern Folklore Quarterly, June 1940
 "New Mexican Spanish Feasts", published in California Folklore Quarterly, 1942
 A Study of the Phonology and Morphology of New Mexican Spanish, Based on a Collection of 410 Folk-tales (main text (Parts I and II) in English, and tale volumes (Part III) in Spanish, 1937), Online text, University of Pennsylvania
 An Annotated Bibliography of Spanish Folklore in New Mexico and Southern Colorado (with Marjorie Tully). University of New Mexico Press, 1950
 The New Mexican ‘Alabado’, Stanford University Press, 1951
  The Sources and Diffusion of the Mexican Shepherds' Plays. Guadalajara, Mexico: Librería La Joyita, 1965
 "Introducción a los Cuentos Populares Nuevomejicanos", published in Boletín de la Academia Norteamericana de la Lengua Española, New York, 1976
 Cuentos Españoles de Colorado y Nuevo Mexico (Spanish Folk Tales of Colorado and New Mexico),  Santa Fe: Museum of New Mexico Press, 1977

See also

Chicano English

References

External links
 Library of Congress "Hispano Music and Culture of the Northern Rio Grande: The Juan B. Rael Collection", American Memory, Library of Congress
 Enrique R. LaMadrid "Nuevo Mexicanos of the Upper Rio Grande: Culture, History, and Society", American Memory, Library of Congress
 "Juan B. Rael, professor emeritus of Spanish, dies at 93", 15 Nov 2003, Stanford News Service
 "Special Collections", Manuscripts Division Latin American and Iberian Studies, Stanford University

1900 births
1993 deaths
American ethnographers
American folklorists
Linguists from the United States
American people of Spanish descent
Neomexicanos
Saint Mary's College of California alumni
Stanford University alumni
University of California, Berkeley alumni
Writers from Santa Fe, New Mexico
Writers from Taos, New Mexico
American Folklorists of Color
20th-century linguists